Thérèse Nelson is an American chef, author, and founder of Black Culinary History. She is recognized for focusing on preserving the Black culinary heritage and sharing the work of her colleagues for future generations.

Early life 
Nelson was born and raised in the historic Weequaic section of Newark, New Jersey.

Career 
Following her graduation from Johnson & Wales University where she earned degrees in culinary arts and restaurant management, Nelson worked in the hotel restaurant industry, including time at the Marriott, Hilton, Orient Express, and Four Seasons. 
During this time, Nelson began to explore her culinary history as an American chef and found that such exploration required she also explore her African heritage, something that culinary school did not provide.

Get' Em Girls 
In 2006, Nelson worked for Get Em' Girl Inc., providing recipe consulting for two cookbooks, The Get Em' Girl's Guide to the Power of Cuisine and The Get Em Girl's Guide to the Perfect Get Together, as food editor for the company's lifestyle website Get Em' Girls.com (no longer active).

Freelance writing and speaking 
Nelson writes for a variety of publications, including TASTE, Eater, and the NY Times. She is a public speaker, often sharing on culinary history and identity at conferences such as Harvard's Black Arts Festival and Baltimore's Light City Festival. She also has been interviewed by a variety of publications and media sites, including Gambit, We Are Chefs, and Heritage Radio Network.

Private catering 
From 2006 to 2013, Nelson ran a private catering company with partners. Her company provided craft-service work for MTV and BET productions and for industry events for a range of Black entertainment organizations, including Black Enterprise, Roc Nation, and Essence.

Black Culinary history 
Nelson founded the organization and site Black Culinary History in 2008 to provide "a way to connect chefs of color to preserve black heritage throughout the African culinary diaspora, to promote and share the work of her colleagues, and to preserve the legacy being constructed by black chefs for this next generation." The site includes a blog, booklists, and a video collection. The organization's secondary stated goal is "as a direct rebuttal to the pervasive and misguided narrative that suggests because traditional media coverage excludes black chefs we don't exist." The site has not had significant updates since 2015.

More recently, Nelson has managed a YouTube channel, Black Culinary History, and a Twitter feed @BlackCulinary.

Personal life 
Nelson resides in East Harlem, New York City.

Publications 
 Hot Sauce in My Veins, TASTE
 My Crush on George Washington Carver, TASTE
 Cookbooks, Not Restaurants, Are Giving Black Foodways an Identity, TASTE 9/28/2018

Recipes 
 Grandaddy's Pickled Pepper Table Sauce, TASTE
 Simple Southern Hot Sauce, TASTE

References

External links 
 BlackCulinary Twitter account run by Nelson
 Black Culinary History YouTube channel

Year of birth missing (living people)
Living people
Chefs from New Jersey
Johnson & Wales University alumni
People from East Harlem
People from Newark, New Jersey